George Emanuel Călin better known as Manuel Riva is a Romanian DJ and record producer. A long running artist and DJ, he had started with the trop Demmo and later in the duo Deepcentral.

In Demmo (Romania) (2001-2006)

Manuel Riva began his musical career as George Călin with the band Demmo, that also included Anamaria Ferentz and Vik. Together they released four albums: Pentru inima ta, Trei, Ding Dang Dong and Cântecul meu. The band had a considerable hit with the Romanian version of "Darla Dirladada". The band lasted from 2001 to 2006.

In Deepcentral (2008-2013)

In 2008 George Călin established the band Deepcentral with him as DJ and Doru Todoruț as vocalist. with two albums through Universal Music Romania, Deepcentral (in 2009) and O stea (2013). Charting hits with Deecentral included notably "Russian Girl", "In Love", "Music Makes Me Free" and "Speed of Sound" in the period 2009 to 2011. His song "Gura ta" by Delia and Deepcentral, topped as number one Romanian hit for 2016.

As Manuel Riva
In 2016, Manuel Riva built on his DJ career and in the course of 2 years released many tracks and remixes. One of his collaborations, "Close the Deal" (with Optick and Eneli), a deep house with progressive influences, drew the attention of Dutch DJ Tiësto who played it on his Club Life radio show. In February 2016, Manuel Riva released alongside Eneli the song "Mhm Mhm" with heavy rotation on all major Romanian radio stations peaking at number 3 on the Billboard Dance / Club Chart in the United States in addition to charting in many European Shazam charts. He was nominated for the Best Romanian Act at the MTV Europe Music Awards 2016. In November 2016, he released "Hey Now" another hit for Riva. He solidified his success in 2017 with "Resolution", "Saturday Night, Man", in collaboration with Hyptonix, "Treehouse" (featuring Waleed) and "Kiyomi". His songs were mixed or included in the podcasts of renowned DJs such as Sam Feldt, Oliver Heldens, Ummet Ozcan and Cosmic Gate. At the Media Music Awards 2017, Manuel Riva was named "Best Romanian DJ". Also in 2017, he opened the Untold music festival on the main stage.

In 2018 he collaborated with Alexandra Stan, with whom he released the single "Miami" featuring her voice. "Miami" became a big international hit, although the original comes from 2016. The song was used as the anthem for the 2018 Neversea Festival. It also charted on the Romanian Airplay 100 chart as well as Billboard Dance Club Songs peaking at number 10 and on Dance/Electronic Songs charts peaking at number 44.

Discography as George Călin

Albums
With Demmo (Romania)
Pentru inima ta
Trei
Ding Dang Dong
Cântecul meu
With Deepcentral
Deepcentral (2009)
O stea (2013)

Discography as Manuel Riva

Singles
2016: "Mhm Mhm" (feat Eneli)
2016: "Hey Now"
2017: "Sacred Touch" (feat. Misha Miller)
2018: "Miami" (feat Alexandra Stan)
2019: "What Mama Said" (ft. Misha Miller)
2020: Confusion (feat Florena)

Charting

Non-charting
2015: "How You Say" (feat. Hyptonix)
2015: "Wrong or Right" (feat. Eneli)
2016: "We Are One" (feat. Eneli)
2016: "Close the Deal" (feat. Optick & Eneli)
2016: "We Own the Night" (feat. Onuc & Luise)
2017: "Resolution"
2017: "Saturday Night, Man" (feat. Hyptonix)
2017: "Treehouse" (feat. Waleed)
2017: "Kiyomi
2017: "Jupiter Sun"
2017: "Ravin'" (feat. Robert Konstantin)
2017: "The Wall" (feat. Robert Konstantin)

Remixes

References

External links
Official website

Romanian DJs
Romanian record producers
Living people
Year of birth missing (living people)